Wildwood Lake is a reservoir in Jackson County, in the U.S. state of Missouri. It is located one mile southeast of Raytown.

References

Reservoirs in Missouri
Kansas City metropolitan area
Bodies of water of Jackson County, Missouri
Dams in Missouri
United States Army Corps of Engineers dams